Shabana Raza, also known as Neha Bajpai or simply Neha, is an Indian actress and film producer known for her works in Bollywood.

Career 
Shabana Raza made her film debut opposite Bobby Deol in Kareeb (1998). Her next release was Hogi Pyaar Ki Jeet (1999), where she played the leading lady opposite Ajay Devgn. She went on to act in several more films, including Fiza (2000) where she played Hrithik Roshan's love interest, Rahul (2001) and Aatma. After a break, she returned to acting in 2010 under her original name.

Personal life
Shabana Raza met actor Manoj Bajpayee after the release of her film, Kareeb, and has been together since then. They married in April 2006. The couple have a daughter, Awa Nayla.

Filmography

References

External links

Indian film actresses
Living people
1975 births
Actresses in Hindi cinema
Actresses in Tamil cinema
Actresses from Maharashtra